The United States Army Logistics Management College (ALMC), a subordinate school of the United States Army Combined Arms Support Command, is located at Fort Lee, Virginia.

The Army Logistics Management College's role was to develop and present quality education programs in logistics science, management science, and acquisition management to personnel of the Department of Defense, other Federal agencies, and foreign governments. In addition, ALMC offers research and consulting services that contribute to materiel readiness and improve acquisition and logistics management.

Army Logistics Management College was originally established as the Army Logistics Management Center on 1 July 1954. The Logistics Management Center conducted a 12-week Army Supply Management Course, but quickly expanded. On 1 May 1956, the Center was established under the operational control of the Department of the Army Deputy Chief of Staff for Logistics (DCSLOG), adding five new functional courses in management of requirements, procurement, distribution, maintenance, and property disposal to the curriculum. Four months later, the ALMC curriculum expanded again to include correspondence courses and use of accredited instructors in off-campus modes. In September 1958, logistics research and doctrine were added.

On 1 August 1962, ALMC was placed under the command of the US Army Materiel Command (AMC). Under AMC, new emphasis was placed on instruction in management of research and development, acquisition management, and on integration of all phases of the life cycle of materiel. In September 1969, ALMC started the bi-monthly publication of Army Logistician magazine, which transitioned on its 40th anniversary issue in the Summer of 2009, into the Army Sustainment Magazine, continuing its tradition as a much sought-after Professional Bulletin for Logisticians and Sustainers around the world. On 21 July 1970, a new four-story brick academic building called Bunker Hall was dedicated at the campus.

In August 1987, ALMC was redesignated as the US Army Logistics Management College, and on 1 October 1991, ALMC became a Training and Doctrine Command (TRADOC) school under the command of the US Army Combined Arms Support Command and Fort Lee.

In 1992 ALMC assumed responsibility for the program to prepare Captains and First Lieutenants in the Ordnance, Quartermaster, Transportation, Aviation, and Medical branches, for company command and staff positions in multifunctional battalions. Renamed the Combined Logistics Captains Career Course (CLC3) in March 1999, CLC3 became ALMC's premiere course. The ALMC curriculum continued to expand in multifunctional logistics, supply automation management, operational logistics planning and intern development.

In September 2002, ALMC received formal accreditation as a non-degree-granting occupational education institution, recognized by the U.S. Department of Education.

On 2 July 2009, Army Logistics Management College became the Army Logistics University with the dedication of ALU's new $100 million university campus.

References

External links
 Official web site

Military logistics of the United States
Prince George County, Virginia
United States Army schools